Sherron Walker (born April 17, 1956) is an American athlete. She competed in the women's long jump at the 1976 Summer Olympics. In 2012, Walker was inducted into the Snohomish County Sports Hall of Fame.

Early life
Walker grew up in Everett, Washington and attended Everett High School. In high school, Walker competed in sprint and relay races and did the high jump. By the time Walker graduated in 1975, she had won four consecutive state crowns.

References

External links
 

1956 births
Living people
Athletes (track and field) at the 1976 Summer Olympics
American female long jumpers
Olympic track and field athletes of the United States
Place of birth missing (living people)
21st-century American women